Kartoot is an upcoming Hindi-language Indian drama film starring Madalasa Sharma, Sahil Kohli, Himani Shivpuri and Anup Jalota. The film is produced by Anup Jalota and Sadhna Dutt. The movie is scheduled to release on 11th Nov 2022.

Cast
 Madalasa Sharma as Nighar
 Sahil Kohli as Samir
 Piyush Ranade as Abhishek Pandey
 Dhiraj Rai as Ramesh
 Himani Shivpuri as Khala
 Shubhangi Latker as Farida
 Utkarsh Naik as Saban
 Pragya Mishra as Priya
 Anup Jalota as police commissioner

References

External links
 
 https://www.bollywoodhungama.com/movie/kartoot
 https://www.cinestaan.com/movies/kartoot-51195
 https://www.filmibeat.com/bollywood/movies/kartoot.html#cast
 https://www.ottplay.com/movie/kartoot-2022/4ec0685555903
 https://in.bookmyshow.com/movies/kartoot/ET00340535

Upcoming films
Hindi-language drama films
Indian drama films
2022 drama films
2022 films